

Events
11 March - Ibrahim Gökçek and Helin Bölek, members of the Turkish band Grup Yorum, are taken to hospital for treatment in the course of their long-running hunger strike, but they are discharged a week later after refusing treatment.
 Music album on ancient Tamil poetry, Sandham: Symphony Meets Classical Tamil by Composer Rajan Somasundaram featured in Amazon's Top#10 International Music albums in July 2020 - 
25 May - Kim Woo-seok releases his first solo single and mini-album. 
27 July - Mongolian band The Hu go to the top of the UK Rock & Metal Albums Chart with their debut album The Gereg.

Albums
Sandham: Symphony Meets Classical Tamil by Composer Rajan Somasundaram and sung by Bombay Jayashri, Saindhavi, Karthik, Pragathi Guruprasad, Priyanka, William Henry Curry and others  - 
BTS - Map of the Soul: 7 (February 21)
Hiroko Moriguchi - Gundam Song Covers 2 (June 10)
Joji - Nectar (July 10)
Sugam Pokharel - Swyet Hanshini
Unique Salonga - PANGALAN: (March 27)
Hemant Sharma - Indra Daliye (May 21)
Winner - Remember (April 9)
SB19 - Get in the Zone (Album) (July 31)

Classical
Bechara El Khoury – Unfinished Journey
Jasdeep Singh Degun – Arya
Karen Tanaka – Techno Etudes II

Opera
 Huang Ruo and David Henry Hwang – M. Butterfly

Film and TV scores
Eishi Segawa – The Untold Tale of the Three Kingdoms
Gopi Sundar – Entha Manchivaadavuraa

Musical films
Chal Mera Putt 2 (India - Punjabi)
Kilometers and Kilometers (India - Malayalam), with score by Sushin Shyam and songs by Sooraj S. Kurup
King of Prism All Stars: Prism Show Best 10 (Japan)
Love Aaj Kal (India - Hindi)
Naan Sirithal (India - Tamil) 
Sarileru Neekevvaru (India - Telugu)
Shahenshah (Bangladesh)
Street Dancer 3D (India - Hindi)

Deaths
January 1 – Katsura Shinnosuke, 67, Japanese rakugoka and musician (leukaemia)
January 4 – Junko Hirotani, 63, Japanese singer (breast cancer)
January 19 – Sunanda Patnaik, 85, Indian classical singer
February 14 – Sonam Sherpa, 48, Indian guitarist (cardiac arrest)
February 27 – Suthep Wongkamhaeng, 85, Thai luk krung singer
March 17 
, 79, Taiwanese operatic singer and actress. 
Thái Thanh, 85, Vietnamese-American singer.
March 29 – Paravai Muniyamma, 82, Indian folk singer and actress
April 2 – Nirmal Singh Khalsa, 67, Indian singer and priest (COVID-19)
April 3 – Helin Bölek, 28, Armenian/Turkish singer (hunger strike)
April 6 – M. K. Arjunan, 84, Indian composer.
April 8 – Glenn Fredly, 44, Indonesian R&B singer-songwriter (meningitis)
April 10 – Shanti Hiranand, 87, Indian classical singer
May 5 – Didi Kempot, 53, Indonesian campursari singer
May 7 – Ibrahim Gökçek, 39/40, Turkish folk musician (hunger strike)
May 16 – Azad Rahman, 76, Bangladeshi composer
May 29 – Yogesh, 77, Indian lyricist
June 1 – Wajid Khan (Sajid–Wajid), 43, Indian composer (complications from kidney infection and COVID-19)
July 30 – Sonam Tshering Lepcha, 92, Indian folk musician and composer
August 9 – Alauddin Ali, 67, Bangladeshi composer (lung complications)
August 17 – Pandit Jasraj, 90, Indian classical vocalist
September 9 – Yopie Latul, 65, Indonesian singer
September 16 – Alien Huang, 36, Taiwanese singer, actor and television presenter (aortic dissection)
September 25 – S. P. Balasubrahmanyam, 74, Indian playback singer (COVID-19)
October 8 – Mohammad-Reza Shajarian, 80, Iranian traditional vocalist master
October 9 – David Refael ben Ami, 70, Israeli singer
November 10 – Rahayu Supanggah, 71, Indonesian composer

By country 
 2020 in Chinese music
 2020 in Japanese music
 2020 in Philippine music
 2020 in South Korean music

See also 
 2020 in music

References 

Asia
Asian music
2020 in Asia